2007–08 Pirveli Liga was the 19th season of the Georgian Pirveli Liga. The Pirveli Liga is the second division of Georgian Football. It consist of reserve and professional teams.

Although reserve teams was allowed to play in the same league system, they are not allowed to play in the same division.

Pirveli Liga East

Pirveli Liga West

Champions playoff

Magharoeli Chiatura promoted as champion.

Relegation play-offs

Gagra remain at 2nd level

Aftermath
FC Magharoeli Chiatura withdrew from 2008–09 Umaglesi Liga and renamed to FC Chiatura, FC Gagra took the place.
FC Tbilisi split with FC Olimpi Rustavi, they took the B team place in Pirveli Liga next season.
FC Norchi Dinamoeli Tbilisi and FC Merani B Tbilisi were split up, Norchi Dinamo (Young Dinamo) took the place in Pirveli Liga next season. While FC Merani Tbilisi played in West Zone due to relegation.
Due to 2008 South Ossetia war, FC Meshakre Agara withdrew.

See also
2007–08 Umaglesi Liga
2007–08 Georgian Cup

External links
Georgia 2007/08 RSSSF

Erovnuli Liga 2 seasons
2007–08 in Georgian football
Georgia